The 2023 Copa do Nordeste qualification (officially the Eliminatórias Copa do Nordeste 2023) was the qualifying tournament of the 2023 Copa do Nordeste. It was played from 5 to 8 January 2023. Sixteen teams competed to decide four places in the Copa do Nordeste.

Format changes
Starting from this season, the following format changes were implemented:
Sixteen teams competed in the tournament. Every federation had a team qualified by the 2022 CBF ranking, while seven teams qualified by participating in their respective state championships.

The teams competed in two rounds where the four winners advanced to the Copa do Nordeste.

Qualified teams
Every federation had a team qualified by the 2022 CBF ranking, while the seven best placed federations in the 2022 CBF state ranking (Ceará, Bahia, Pernambuco, Alagoas, Maranhão, Rio Grande do Norte and Paraíba) earned an extra berth in the tournament by participating in their respective state championships.

Schedule
The schedule of the competition was as follows.

Draw
The teams were seeded by their 2022 CBF ranking (shown in parentheses).  

For the first round, the sixteen teams were drawn into eight ties, with the best seeded team playing against the sixteenth seeded team, while the second-best seeded team facing the fifteenth-best, third against fourteenth, fourth against thirteenth, etc. The higher-seeded team hosted the leg.

Competition format
The teams played a single-elimination tournament with the following rules:
The tournament was played on a single-leg basis, with the higher-seeded team hosting the leg.
 If tied, the penalty shoot-out would be used to determine the winners.
Extra time would not be played and away goals rule would not be used during the tournament.

First round

|}

Second round

|}

2023 Copa do Nordeste qualified teams
The following four teams qualified for the 2023 Copa do Nordeste.

Top goalscorers

References

Copa do Nordeste
2023 in Brazilian football